Oleg Andreyevich Gusev (born 3 March 1964) is a Russian entrepreneur and politician from Urals. He is currently the head of Ural Financial Holding enterprise, based in Ekaterinburg, and involved in massive land development projects and other large businesses. Formerly he also was a member of regional government ranking up to vice prime minister.

Nowadays he is also known as arts collector: he possesses paintings of Picasso, Chagall, Kandinsky, Salvador Dalí, Matisse, Warhol and others.

Biography and career 
Born in Chelyabinsk on April 3, 1964.

Graduated from Ural State Technical University in 1986 as electrical engineer. In 1997 got a second degree in finances at Ural State University of Economics.

Worked at Kalinin Machine-Building Plant until early 1990s.

In 1993-1998 was participating in creation of, and furtherly headed, the major Zoloto Platina Bank.

In the course of the career, for various periods of time, Gusev also held multiple major positions in a number of financial institutions of Urals and Moscow. Particularly, he owned a Chelyabinsk-based bank called Monetny Dom ("coin house"), which he sold by 2010.

Ural Financial Holding 

From early 2000s he began to work for Ural Financial Holding, a major investment enterprise involved in land development, construction, heavy industries, agriculture, researches.

The Ural Financial Holding is supporting Ekaterinburg Opera Theatre and Demidov Science Fund.

Government activities 

In late 2000s he also worked at Government of Sverdlovsk Oblast as high-ranking official at several positions up to vice prime minister. While at that position, he was appointed by governor Eduard Rossel to supervise Shanghai Cooperation Organisation summit held in Ekaterinburg in 2009.

For a period of time, he was a head of the Oblast's major subdivision: Southern governing district.

In 2003 Gusev was a candidate for mayoral elections in Ekaterinburg, resulting with 3rd place.

He holds several state awards.

Culture and charities 
In 1997 he founded personal charity fund "Good for the people".

Nowadays he is also known as an arts collector: he possesses paintings of Picasso, Chagall, Kandinsky, Salvador Dalí, Matisse, Warhol and others. Sometimes he organizes exhibits of the paintings for public display in Urals.

The Ural Financial Holding is supporting Ekaterinburg Opera Theatre and Demidov Science Fund.

References

External links 
 Oleg Gusev's personal website

Russian businesspeople in real estate
Politicians from Chelyabinsk
1964 births
Living people
Businesspeople from Chelyabinsk